Committee on the Judiciary may mean:
 United States House Committee on the Judiciary
 United States Senate Committee on the Judiciary